Experimental and Applied Acarology is a monthly peer-reviewed scientific journal covering all aspects of acarology. It was established in 1985 and is published by Springer Science+Business Media. The editor-in-chief is Maurice W. Sabelis (University of Amsterdam).

Abstracting and indexing 
The journal is abstracted and indexed in:

External links 
 

Acarology journals
English-language journals
Springer Science+Business Media academic journals
Publications established in 1985
Monthly journals